The Collège de Boncourt, in the (now) 5th arrondissement of Paris, rue Bordet or Bordeille (modern rue Descartes), was established in 1353 by Pierre Becoud (which became "Boncourt" by alteration)

History 

During the 16th century, comedies and tragedies were often performed on the site, particularly Cléopâtre captive, a tragedy by Étienne Jodelle. Marc-Antoine Muret taught in the college.

The college was once completely refurbished in 1688 by Pierre Galand, its principal. It was attached to the College de Navarre. Then, from 1738, a new pavilion took the place of the old college. From 1804 to 1976, the building housed the offices of the École Polytechnique, then those of the Ministry of Higher Education and Research.

Bibliography 
 Henri Chamart, "Le Collège de Boncourt et les origines du théâtre classique", Mélanges offerts à M. Abel Lefranc, Paris, Droz, 1936, p. 246-260.
 Recueil des titres concernans l'union des collèges de Boncour et Tournay au collège royal de Navarre. Procez verbal du 31 aoust 1637. Read on line.

External links 
 Article sur la fondation du collège

Boncourt
College Boncourt